Tsakiris is a Greek surname. Notable people with the surname include:

 Athanassios Tsakiris (born 1965), Greek biathlete and cross-country skier
 Constantinos Tsakiris (born 1971), Greek shipowner and banker
 Shaun Tsakiris (born 1979), American soccer player

Greek-language surnames
Surnames